Castle Hill Productions was an independent television and film distribution company handling classic and independent films whose library spans eight decades.

History 

Founded in 1978 by Julian Schlossberg, Castle Hill Productions revived and restored over 200 classic motion pictures, many of which were originally United Artists releases and inherited from the family and/or estates of the films' original producers under the Caidin Film Company.

As the company grew, Castle Hill acquired the rights to many films by John Cassavetes, such as Faces and A Woman Under the Influence. Both Schlossberg and Gena Rowlands (Cassavetes' widow), through their company, Faces Distribution, have worked hard to revive the films for today's audiences in order for them to better appreciate the late director's work.

Castle Hill also bought the rights to many of the films of Elia Kazan and Orson Welles. In addition to their classic films, the company also distributed contemporary films (usually up to ten a year), and has been involved in in-house production, creating documentaries on filmmakers and news events.

Closure and holdings 
In 2009, Castle Hill closed. Most of their holdings sold to another independent company, Westchester Films, managed by Schlossberg.

Most distribution rights to the Castle Hill library are handled by either Warner Bros., Criterion (via Janus Films), or Image Entertainment.

In 2014, the Westchester/Castle Hill holdings were purchased by entertainment distribution company Shout! Factory.

Key films of Castle Hill 

Stagecoach
A Night in Casablanca
A Face in the Crowd
Othello
What's Up Tiger Lily
Breaker Morant
Baby Doll
Followers
Blue Moon
Finding Home
Jersey Guy

References

External links 
 Castle Hill Productions at IMDb

Film distributors of the United States
Entertainment companies based in New York City
Mass media companies based in New York City
Entertainment companies established in 1978
Companies disestablished in 2009
1978 establishments in New York (state)
2009 disestablishments in New York (state)
Defunct companies based in New York City
American independent film studios